The Winter Magic Festival is a community festival celebrated around the Winter solstice in Katoomba in the Blue Mountains of New South Wales, Australia since 1994. 

The Winter Magic Festival has the highest profile and is the most anticipated of Blue Mountains' annual events. The festival has been going for  years and has always been organised by volunteers, under community ownership. The Blue Mountains is New South Wales' first City of the Arts and Katoomba is the heart of that city. On Winter Magic weekend artists, musicians, dancers, drummers, choirs and community take over one of Australia's most famous towns. During the event, the main street of Katoomba is closed to motor traffic and open to pedestrian traffic. This allows the main street to become a performance space. The streets are lined with market stalls, available spaces are converted to music and performance stages, and everybody who attends is encouraged to dress in costume.

Katoomba Winter Magic has a strong local focus and very wide general appeal.

History

John Ellison, then cultural development coordinator with Blue Mountains City Council, following an invitation from  the local Chamber of Commerce to revitalize Christmas in July, created and opened the Winter Magic Festival in 1994. The inaugural event attracted 2,000 visitors.

In 2014 the festival attracted approximately 30,000 visitors. By 2016, the festival was attracting up to 50,000 visitors.

The 2019 festival didn't have a parade but instead focused on community arts and performance.

In 2018 the festival went into hiatus after organisers concluded the festival could not continue in its current form. The Winter Magic Festival Association relaunched Winter Magic on 22 June 2019.

In 2020 & 2021 the festivals had been cancelled as:
 "Meeting the Covid19 requirements in an open street environment with multiple entry points is too big a challenge for our small volunteer Committee."
 
Come August 2022, the festival will resume after a two-year hiatus.

References

External links
Official website
Blue Mountains City Council

Festivals in New South Wales
Katoomba, New South Wales
Recurring events established in 1994
1994 establishments in Australia
Culture of the Blue Mountains (New South Wales)